Omu may refer to:

 Ōmu, Hokkaido, a town in Hokkaido
 Omu Okwei (1872–1943), Nigerian queen merchant
 Paul Omu (born 1940), military governor of South-Eastern State, Nigeria
 Stella Omu (born 1946), Nigerian politician who was elected as national Senator on the People's Democratic Party
 Ohmu, a type of creature from Hayao Miyazaki's Nausicaa of the Valley of the Wind
 Osaka Metropolitan University
 Owensboro Municipal Utilities

See also
 Om (disambiguation)
 Ohm (disambiguation)
 Omoo